The Department of Further Education, Employment, Science and Technology (DFEEST) was an agency of the Government of South Australia whose responsibilities included:
 coordinating high quality public vocational education and training 
 building skills through workforce planning and skills development programs 
 increasing the workforce development and planning culture in South Australian workplaces 
 fostering innovation through science and research  
Information Economy

Closure
DFEEST ceased as of 1 July 2014 when all functions were rolled into the new Department of State Development.

Notes

External sources
Home page, Accessed 2014-11-24

Defunct government departments of Australia
Government departments of South Australia